Alhaji Mohamed Kakay is a Sierra Leonean politician who is a member of parliament of Sierra Leone representing his hometown of Koinadugu District, one of the five districts that make up the Northern Province. Kakay is from the Mandingo ethnic group.

External links
https://web.archive.org/web/20081010024540/http://parliamentsl.org/members.htm

Members of the Parliament of Sierra Leone
Living people
Year of birth missing (living people)
Sierra Leonean Mandingo people
People from Koinadugu District